Frederick William Murphy (November 6, 1877 – January 22, 1937) was an American football player, coach, official, and lawyer.  He served as the head football coach at Massachusetts Agricultural College—now the University of Massachusetts Amherst—from 1899 to 1900 and at the University of Missouri from 1900 to 1901, compiling a career record of 18–18–2.

Biography
Murphy was born on November 6, 1877, in Dover, New Hampshire.  He attended Brockton High School, where he played football.  Murphy attended Brown University, where he played on football team as an end from 1895 to 1898.  He captained the team as a senior in 1898.  After coaching at Massachusetts Agricultural College and Missouri, Murphy returned to his alma mater in 1903 as an assistant football coach under Dave Fultz.  Murphy graduated from Harvard Law School in 1904.  He and Fultz formed a law partnership in New York City in 1906.  The two also officiated major college football games together.  Murphy died on January 22, 1937, at St. John's Hospital in Brooklyn, New York.

Head coaching record

References

External links
 

1877 births
1937 deaths
19th-century players of American football
American football ends
College football officials
Brown Bears football players
Brown Bears football coaches
Missouri Tigers football coaches
UMass Minutemen football coaches
Harvard Law School alumni
New York (state) lawyers
Sportspeople from Brockton, Massachusetts
People from Dover, New Hampshire
Sportspeople from Strafford County, New Hampshire
Players of American football from Massachusetts